This is a list of educational institutions located in the Asian country of Bahrain.

Museums

Schools

Primary and secondary education
The following primary schools and secondary schools are both national and international schools.

Tertiary education

See also

 Education in Bahrain
 Lists of museums
 Lists of schools

References

Bahrain education-related lists
Lists of buildings and structures in Bahrain
Lists of organisations based in Bahrain

Bahrain
Bahrain